The men's 10 metre running target mixed team competition at the 2006 Asian Games in Doha, Qatar was held on 6 December at the Lusail Shooting Range.

Schedule
All times are Arabia Standard Time (UTC+03:00)

Records

Results

References

ISSF Results Overview
Results

External links
Official website

Men RT X T